EBS International Documentary Festival also known as EIDF, is an annual film festival hosted by the Educational Broadcasting System of South Korea since 2004. It is "Asia’s prestigious documentary festival", with focus on highlighting documentary films on Asia or made in Asia. It is open to countries from around the world. In addition to screenings and broadcasts, EIDF events also include master classes and workshops.

15th edition of festival was held from August 20 to August 26, 2018. 72 films from 33 countries were screened during the event in theaters as well as through TV via  EBS local news channels and live-streamed on YouTube and Facebook.

History

Awards
Festival Choice Grand Prix (US$10,000) : Awarded to the most complete and elaborate documentary among the twelve nominees in the EIDF main competition
 Edu Choice Grand Prix (US$10,000) : Awarded to the best documentary among the nominees in the EIDF 2012 main competition which provides refreshing insights for education as well
Spirit Award (US$7,000) : Awarded to the documentary among the twelve nominees for the EIDF main competition that best reveals the director's artistic spirit and genuine message according to the theme of each year's EIDF
Special Jury Award (US$5,000) : Awarded to the documentary among the twelve nominees for the EIDF main competition that shows outstanding approach in experimentation and form
UNICEF Special Award (US$5,000) : Among the existing entries, awarded to the films which contain children related contents or have hopeful messages for children
Audience Award (US$3,000) : Awarded to the documentary among the twelve nominees for the EIDF main competition that receives the most votes over the online and offline voting system

Special Events
 Master's Class : The Master's Class offers special events for general audiences who have genuine interest in documentaries and documentary makers. The audience will be able to have a glimpse into the present state of documentary through filmmakers' and/or producers' own voices.
Master's Class of EIDF 2009 : Kaori Sakagami (Out of Frame: Search for Alternatives through Documentary Filmmaking), Thom Andersen (Get out of the Media) & Yves Jeanneau (Sunny or Cloudy?: International Co-Production)
 Director's Class : In the Director's Class, directors of Festival Choice will share their passion, experience and knowledge with festival participants, who will be able to obtain practical know-hows such as documentary production and filmmaking.
Director's Class of EIDF 2009 : Mary Katzke & Nati Baratz (Character Driven Documentary Storytelling), Karen Michael (Documentary of the Multiplatform Era), Andrei Dascalescu (Emerging Film Director), Sally Gutierrez Dewar (Micro-narratives, Gender and How We Document) & Stelios Koul (Finctional Documentary)
 Special Class : EIDF provides the special event of award-winning documentary makers with Korean participants from internationally known documentary film festivals such as HOTDOC and IDFA.
Special Class of EIDF 2009 : Simon El Habre, Award-winner of Best Documentary at HOTDOCs 2009 (For International Competence in Documentary-making: The Interaction of Structure and Editing)

EIDF Documentary Fund (EDF)
EIDF has launched EIDF Documentary Fund (EDF) assisting projects to develop and supply documentary contents for better quality. EDF has attracted many documentary directors and reinforced the works of documentaries in development. 
EDF announced that the Best Choice of EIDF 2009 is The Hazy Journey of the Illuminating Tree directed by Yi Seung Jun, and the winner will gain the financial support of KRW 30,000,000. Moreover, the winner's final production will be shown on the 7th EIDF in 2010.

Award-Winning Films in the Past

See also
List of festivals in South Korea
List of festivals in Asia

References

External links
 EBS International Documentary Festival
 EBS website (Korean)

Documentary film festivals in South Korea
Film festivals in Seoul
Annual events in South Korea